The 2018 Senior Open Championship was a senior major golf championship and the 32nd Senior Open Championship, held on 26–29 July at the Old Course at St Andrews in St Andrews, Scotland. It was the first Senior Open Championship played at the course and the 16th Senior Open Championship played as a senior major championship.

Miguel Ángel Jiménez won by one stroke over defending champion Bernhard Langer. The 2018 event was Jiménez's first Senior Open Championship title and his second senior major championship victory.

Venue

The 2018 event was the first Senior Open Championship played at St Andrews.

Course layout

Field
The field consisted of 144 competitors: 136 professionals and 8 amateurs. An 18-hole stroke play qualifying round was held on Monday, 23 July for players who were not already exempt.

Nationalities in the field

Past champions in the field

Made the cut

Missed the cut

Round summaries

First round
Thursday, 26 July 2018

Second round
Friday 27 July 2018

Amateurs: Elliott (+2),  Howison (+5), Maxfield (+6),  Dornell (+7),  Lacy (+8),  Lutz (+8),  McCoy (+9),  Hughes (+10)

Third round
Saturday, 28 July 2018

Final round
Sunday, 29 July 2018

Source:

Scorecard

Cumulative tournament scores, relative to par

Source:

Notes and references

External links
Results on European Tour website
Results on PGA Tour website

Senior major golf championships
Golf tournaments in Scotland
Senior Open Championship
Senior Open Championship
Senior Open Championship